Roberto Córdova (Mexico City, October 1899 – 1967) was a Mexican jurist, international judge, and diplomat. Córdova served as judge of the International Court of Justice (ICJ) between 1955 and 1964. He was the second of four Mexicans to have served as ICJ judges, following Isidro Fabela, and preceding Luis Padilla Nervo and Bernardo Sepúlveda Amor.

Córdova was also a member of the International Law Commission of the United Nations between 1949 and 1955.

Career 
Roberto Córdova studied at the Law School of the Universidad Nacional Autónoma de México and attended the University of Texas on a scholarship. A former athlete, he represented Mexico in the Olympics. He then served as Mexico's agent in the United States-Mexico Claims Commission in the 1920s and in arbitration negotiations with the United States between 1937 and 1940.

Between 1938 and 1943 he was legal adviser to the Embassy of Mexico in Washington D.C. He also served as an Ambassador to Costa Rica in 1943. He was a delegate of Mexico in the Chapultepec Conference of 1945, which laid the foundations for the Inter-American Treaty of Mutual Assistance, and the San Francisco Conference, in which the Charter of the United Nations was adopted.

He served in two of the most prominent international law bodies. From 1949 to 1954 he was a member of the newly established UN International Law Commission, participating in the very early discussions on the possibility of establishing an International Criminal Court.

In 1955 he was elected judge of the International Court of Justice, together with judges including Hersch Lauterpacht and Lucio Moreno Quintana. He served in this position until 1964. His contribution in the Nottebohm case to the legal status of "'real and effective' nationality in matters of dual or multiple nationality conflicts" has been described as "memorable". He had previously served as Special Rapporteur to the International Law Commission on the topic "nationality, including statelessness". His ILC report on the subject continues to be discussed today.

Read more 

 Roberto Córdova. In: Arthur Eyffinger, Arthur Witteveen, Mohammed Bedjaoui: La Cour Internationale de Justice 1946–1996. Martinus Nijhoff Publishers, The Hague and London 1999, ISBN 9-04-110468-2 , p. 274
 Córdova, Roberto. In: Ronald Hilton (ed.): Who's Who in Latin America. Part I: Mexico. Third revised and expanded edition. Stanford University Press Stanford 1962, ISBN 0-80-470709-X, pp. 30

External links 

 Audiovisual Library of International Law: May 12, 1949 Roberto Córdova (left) during the first session of the International Law Commission.

References 

International Court of Justice judges
International law scholars
1899 births
1967 deaths